Brachyopsis is a monospecific genus of ray-finned fish belonging to the subfamily Brachyopsinae in the family Agonidae. Its only species is Brachyopsis segaliensis which is found in the to the northwest Pacific Ocean where it occurs from the southern Okhotsk Sea to the northern Sea of Japan and the Pacific coast of northern Japan. This species grows to a length of  TL.<

References

Brachyopsinae
Fish described in 1809
Taxa named by Wilhelm Gottlieb Tilesius von Tilenau